Rambergite is a manganese sulfide mineral with formula .

It has been found in anoxic marine sediments, rich in organic matter of the Gotland Deep, Baltic Sea and also in skarn in the Garpenberg area, Dalarna, Sweden. It was named after the mineralogist, Hans Ramberg (1917–1998).

It is a member of the wurtzite group and is chemically related to hauerite.

References

Sulfide minerals
Manganese(II) minerals
Hexagonal minerals
Minerals in space group 186
Minerals described in 1996